The Albert Einstein House at 112 Mercer Street in Princeton, Mercer County, New Jersey, United States was the home of Albert Einstein from 1935 until his death in 1955. His second wife Elsa Einstein died in 1936 while living in this house.

History
The house was built in 1838, as it originally stood on Alexander Street where Stuart Hall of the Princeton Theological Seminary was built in that year, also displacing the house now at 108 Mercer. The home is a simple pattern-book cottage and not in itself of unusual significance. Elsa Einstein purchased the home from Mary Clark Marden on July 24, 1935 for an undisclosed sum according to the deed which was recorded by the Mercer County Clerk's Office on August 1, 1935. For many years, Albert Einstein lived in the house with three women: his sister Maja, his step-daughter Margot Einstein-Marianoff (1899–1986), and his secretary Helen Dukas.

Albert Einstein reportedly requested that this house not be made a museum, and the family did not want it to be recognized as such. Nonetheless it was added to the National Register of Historic Places and further designated a U.S. National Historic Landmark in 1976.
After Albert Einstein, the house was owned by his sculptor step-daughter Margot Einstein until her death in 1986.

The house was owned by Eric Maskin and his family until 2012. He was the Albert O. Hirschman Professor in the School of Social Science at the Institute for Advanced Study in Princeton until 2011, and the 2007 Nobel Prize winner with two others. He is currently a professor of economics at Harvard University. Previously it was occupied by 2004 Nobel prize winner physicist Frank Wilczek when he was a professor in IAS between 1989 and 2001. Reportedly he requested the house from the IAS as his condition to move to Princeton, and he had been holding evening seminars in the house for graduate students. The house is now a private residence even though it is owned by IAS, and is not open to the public. There is no historical marker explaining the house's significance; however, there are strategically placed "Private Residence" signs around the house.

The house is 3,674 square feet, however it has only one bedroom and two baths. In 2012 it was purchased  for $1,417,500. by the Institute for Advanced Study. It is on a half acre parcel which extends 446 feet from the street.

See also
 National Register of Historic Places listings in Mercer County, New Jersey
 Elsa Einstein, Albert Einstein's wife, who lived here during her last days

References

External links
 Mercer Hill Historic District Organization
 Photograph of Amanda Gefter standing in front of the Albert Einstein House
 

National Historic Landmarks in New Jersey
Houses in Princeton, New Jersey
Albert Einstein
National Register of Historic Places in Mercer County, New Jersey
New Jersey Register of Historic Places
Historic district contributing properties in Mercer County, New Jersey
Houses completed in the 19th century